Quaternary Environment of the Eurasian North, abbreviated QUEEN was an international and interdisciplinary research programme in the Arctic.

QUEEN was established to understand the processes involved in environmental changes in the Arctic region by studying past environmental changes during the Late Cenozoic era. A primary objective of QUEEN was to make the environmental record and the history of glaciation during the last 250,000 years as complete for Eurasia as elsewhere. Regions of particular importance for understanding the Arctic's role in global climate change are the Eurasian shelves and the land masses south of these, including Siberian permafrost. The ice sheets in these regions are key elements in paleoclimatic models and play a vital role in the reconstruction of a continuous paleoenvironmental record. Special effort was devoted to the correlation of records from different sources across the Arctic. The programme was running between 1996 and 2003 under the umbrella of the European Science Foundation (ESF) and was coordinated by Prof. Dr. Jörn Thiede.

Objectives 

 Investigation of environmental changes in the Eurasian Arctic over the past 250,000 years, i.e., the last two climatic cycles.
 Establish a record of palaeoenvironmental changes during this period on land,
on continental shelves, and in the deep sea of the Arctic Ocean along the Eurasian
continental margin.
 Correlate terrestrial, shelf and deep ocean records by using a variety of stratigraphic
tools and dating methods.
 Reconstruct ice-sheet growth and decay over this period from geological and
palaeontological evidence.
 Predict how sensitively ice sheets respond to climate change
through the glacial-interglacial cycles by numerical modeling.
 Study relative changes in sea level to build a map of corresponding
vertical movements of the underlying earth surface.
 Investigate how the depth of permafrost has responded to climatic and environmental
change.
 Use high resolution radiocarbon-dating for the environmental record of
the last glacial maximum and deglaciation (<30,000 yr BP).

Institutes involved 
 Alfred Wegener Institute for Polar and Marine Research (AWI), Bremerhaven
 Arctic and Antarctic Research Institute (AARI), St. Petersburg
 Department of Quaternary Geology, University of Lund
 Geological Museum, University of Copenhagen
 Geological Survey of Finland
 Geologisk Institutt, Universitet i Bergen
 Research Center for Marine Geosciences (GEOMAR), Kiel (renamed to Leibniz Institute of Marine Sciences) (IFM-GEOMAR)
 Institute of Earth Studies, University of Wales

References 

Thiede, Jörn & Bauch, Henning (1999) The Late Quaternary history of northern Eurasia and the adjacent Arctic Ocean: an introduction to QUEEN. Boreas, Vol. 28, pp. 3–5. Oslo. ISSN 0300-9483.  
(pdf 132 kB)

Thiede, Jörn (1996) Quaternary Environment of the Eurasian North (QUEEN), European Science Foundation, Strasbourg. (pdf 150 kB)

Grobe, Hannes; Thiede, Jörn (1997) Information System for the ESF/QUEEN Programme (QUEEN/PANGAEA), Initial workshop/proposal, Alfred Wegener Institute for Polar and Marine Research, Bremerhaven. (pdf 100 kB)

Grobe, Hannes (2001) Annual and final report of the EU project Information System for the ESF/QUEEN Programme (QUEEN/PANGAEA), MAS3-CT98-0185, Alfred Wegener Institute/European Network for Research in Global Change (ENRICH) within the R&D Programme 'Environment and Climate', 21 pp. (pdf 100 kB)

Scientific results were published in special QUEEN issues of the following journals:
 Boreas, 28(1), 1999
 Global and Planetary Change, 31(1-4), 2001
 Quaternary Science Reviews, 23(11-13), 2004
 Data management was carried out at WDC-MARE through an EU project resulting in a collection of nearly 4000 data sets. Data are available with metadescription in Open Access from the Information System PANGAEA

Arctic research